Hr. Petit (Mr Petit) is a 1948 Danish crime film directed by Alice O'Fredericks.

Cast
Sigfred Johansen as Hr. Petit
Grethe Holmer as Fru Petit
Tavs Neiiendam as Naboen
Randi Michelsen as Naboens kone
Karin Nellemose as Marianne Boris
Inge Hvid-Møller as Bertha Gautier
Tove Bang as Isabelle
Lisbeth Movin as Marguerite Palsler
Betty Helsengreen as Henriette Palsler
Betty Söderberg as Fru Picot
Jon Branner as Franz Picot
Lily Broberg as Stuepigen Lisson
Jytte Møller as Fleure
Jessie Rindom as Guvernanten
William Jarlbak as Pateren
Tove Grandjean as Fru de Brisville
Karen Meyer as Hendes svigerinde
Preben Lerdorff Rye as Detektiven
Else Jarlbak as Søster Gabrielle
Børge Møller Grimstrup

References

External links

1948 films
1948 crime films
1940s Danish-language films
Danish crime films
Danish black-and-white films
Films directed by Alice O'Fredericks
Films scored by Sven Gyldmark